From the Roots Up is the debut studio album released by English singer-songwriter Delilah. The album was released on 30 July 2012 via Atlantic Records. The album's release follows the release of four hit singles: "Go", "Love You So", "Breathe", and a cover of Minnie Riperton's "Inside My Love". The album entered the UK Albums Chart at #5. Following the release of the album, "Shades of Grey" was also issued as a single. Delilah unveiled the album cover and tracklist on 16 May 2012.

Background
In 2008, Delilah chose a Tottenham studio to work on a college project, where she paired with a local producer to record four tracks. A friend who was associated with Choice FM heard the songs and sent them to Island Records. Stoecker caught the attention of industry executives at major record labels. She spent the following weeks arranging interviews, until she was eventually signed to Atlantic Records.

Stoecker was signed to Atlantic Records at the age of 17 and upon the three years to her debut release, gathered a large back catalogue of songs.
the singer supported British drum & bass/dubstep act Chase & Status during their two-year UK tour, ending in 2011. Stoecker featured a support vocalist, performing Time and Heartbeat, by soul singer Nneka. The duo claimed after hearing one of her tracks, they thought the singer sounded "fantastic". Stoecker co-wrote the track "Time", along with fellow artists Chase & Status and Plan B, she also provided vocals on the track. The single "Time" was released on 21 April 2011, where it peaked at number 21 on the UK Singles Chart. Her writing credits were added to the track "Don't Be Afraid", on Wretch 32's second album Black and White.

Following the success of the tour with Chase & Status, Stoecker later joined Maverick Sabre as his main support act on his 2011 Autumn tour throughout the UK and Ireland. She was also one of the many artists featured on the BBC 1Xtra live tour.

Singles
"Go" was released as the lead single from the album on 6 September 2011. The song peaked at #17 on the UK Singles Chart, and at #9 on the Danish Singles Chart. * "Love You So" was released as the second single from the album on 18 December 2011. The song peaked at #118 on the UK Singles Chart. "Breathe" was released as the third single from the album on 7 May 2012. The song peaked at #87 on the UK Singles Chart. "Inside My Love" was released as the fourth single from the album on 15 July 2012, followed by the album fifteen days later. "Shades of Grey" was released as the fifth single from the album on 16 September 2012. "Never Be Another" was due to be released as the sixth single on 25 November 2012, featuring British rapper Devlin. But the single was never released other than from preview on YouTube and SoundCloud, no reason was given for the single remaining unreleased.

Reception
All music praised the album for its "atmospheric R&B, trip-hop, and singer/songwriter-inflected electronic pop". They continued to praise the "expertly crafted and sophisticated" music "that showcase a nice mix of synthetic, club-oriented sounds as well as more organic instrumentation". Vocally, the critics compared Delilah's voice to Barbadian singer Rihanna along with Sade's more "hushed, smooth style".

Track listing

Personnel
Credits for From the Roots Up adapted from Allmusic
Paloma Ayana - Composer, Producer, Vocals
Balistiq	- Additional Production, Piano, Producer, Programming
Ben Baptie - Mixing Assistant
Joe Barbo - A&R
Chris Booth - Guitar
Andy Burrows - Bass, Composer, Drums, Guitar, Producer
Neil Comber - Engineer, Mixing
Delilah - Primary Artist
Ben Drew - Composer
Tom Elmhirst - Mixing
Fiona Garden - Photography
Rosabella Gregory - Piano
Andy Hayes - Design, Layout
Charlie Hugall	 - Mixing, Producer
Chris Hugall - Mixing
Denis Ingoldsby - Management
Jacqui Lubin - Management
L.V. - Producer
Mikey J - Producer
Mazen Murad - Mastering
Conor O'Mahony - A&R
Reginald Perry - Composer
Plan B - Producer
Finley Quaye - Composer
Dean Reid - Engineer
Minnie Ripperton - Composer
Tom Rogerson - Piano
Richard J. Rudolph - -Composer
Paul Samuels - A&R
Andrew Stewart	- Composer
Ryan Sutherland - Composer
Dan Vinci - Engineer
Leon Ware - Composer
Will Wortley - A&R
Tom Wright-Goss - Composer

Chart performance

Release history

References

External links

2012 debut albums
Atlantic Records albums
Delilah (musician) albums